Dyas is an oil and gas company headquartered in the Netherlands.

Dyas may also refer to:

 Dyas (king), 11th-century Indian king of the Chudasama dynasty
 DYAS, a Philippine radio station
 Dyas Island, Nunavut, Canada
 B. H. Dyas, a defunct department store in California, US
 Robert Dyas, a UK hardware and houseware retailer
An archaic name for the Permian period

People with the surname
 Ada Dyas (1843–1908), Irish actress
 Alexander Dyas (1886–1958), Canadian physician and political figure
 Dave Dyas, rugby league footballer of the 1970s and 1980s
 Ed Dyas (1939–2011), American football player
 Guy Hendrix Dyas (born 1968), English film production designer
 Kevin Dyas (born 1987), Irish Gaelic and Australian rules footballer

See also
 Phalonidia dyas, a species of moth
 DYA (disambiguation)